Potaissa  was a castra in the Roman province of Dacia, located in today's Turda, Romania.

History 
The Dacians established a town that Ptolemy in his Geography calls Patreuissa, which is probably a corruption of Patavissa or Potaissa, the latter being more common. It was conquered by the Romans, who kept the name Potaissa, between AD 101 and 106, during the rule of Trajan, together with parts of Decebal's Dacia.

The name Potaissa is first recorded on a Roman milliarium discovered in 1758 in the nearby Aiton commune.

Milliarium of Aiton is an ancient Roman milestone dating from 108 AD, shortly after the Roman conquest of Dacia, and showing the construction of the road from Potaissa to Napoca, by demand of the Emperor Trajan. This is the first epigraphical attestation of the settlements of Potaissa and Napoca in Roman Dacia.

The complete inscription is: "Imp(erator)/ Caesar Nerva/ Traianus Aug(ustus)/ Germ(anicus) Dacicus/ pontif(ex) maxim(us)/ (sic) pot(estate) XII co(n)s(ul) V/ imp(erator) VI p(ater) p(atriae) fecit/ per coh(ortem) I Fl(aviam) Vlp(iam)/ Hisp(anam) mil(liariam) c(ivium) R(omanorum) eq(uitatam)/ a Potaissa Napo/cam / m(ilia) p(assuum) X". It was recorded in the Corpus Inscriptionum Latinarum, vol. III, the 1627, Berlin, 1863.

This milliarium is an attestation of the road known to be built by Cohors I Hispanorum miliaria.

The castrum established was named Potaissa too and became a municipium, then a colonia. Potaissa was the basecamp of the Legio V Macedonica from 166 to 274.

The Potaissa salt mines were worked in the area since prehistoric times.

See also 
 Porolissum
 Napoca (castra)
 Apulum (castra)
 List of castra in Dacia
 Roman Dacia
 History of Romania

Notes

External links

Roman castra from Romania - Google Maps / Earth

Roman legionary fortresses in Romania
Ancient history of Transylvania
Historic monuments in Cluj County
Turda